Rainbow (translit. Veselka, ; translit. Raduga), is a 1944 Soviet war film directed by Mark Donskoy and written by Wanda Wasilewska based on her novel, Tęcza. The film depicts life in a German-occupied village in Ukraine from the viewpoint of the terrorized villagers.

Cast 
 Elena Tyapkina as Feodosya
 Hans Klering as Captain Kurt Werner 
 Nina Alisova as Pusya 
 Natalya Uzhviy as Olena Kostyuk 
 Anna Lisyanskaya as Malyuchikha 
 Nikolai Bratersky as Petr Gaplik, collaborator mayor
 Vitya Vinogradov as Mishka Malyuchik
 Anton Dunaysky as Grandfather Evdokim Okhabko 
 Vera Ivashova as Olga, Pusya's sister
 Vladimir Chobur as Lt. Kravchenko

Plot

The German conquerors are above nothing, not even the slaughter of small children, to break the spirit of their Soviet captives. Suffering more than most is Olga (Nataliya Uzhviy), a Soviet partisan who returns to the village to bear her child, only to endure the cruelest of arbitrary tortures at the hands of the Nazis. Eventually, the villagers rise up against their oppressors, but unexpectedly do not wipe them out, electing instead to force the surviving Nazis to stand trial for their atrocities in a postwar "people's court." (It is also implied that those who collaborated with the Germans will be dealt with in the same way).

Reception
"Brilliantly acted by virtually everyone in the cast, Rainbow is a remarkable achievement, one that deserves to be better known outside of Russia." It has been described as the most powerful and effective of the Soviet propaganda films produced during the war. The film was recommended to President Franklin Roosevelt by the American ambassador in Moscow in early 1944. Roosevelt cabled Ambassador W. Averell Harriman in Moscow on March 14, 1944 with the message that he had viewed the film, and found it so "beautifully and dramatically presented that it required little translation." FDR stated that he hoped it could be shown to the American public; it was released in the USA in June, 1944, by Artkino Pictures Inc..

References

External links

1944 films
1944 in the Soviet Union
Films based on Polish novels
Films directed by Mark Donskoy
1940s Russian-language films
Films set in Ukraine
Eastern Front of World War II films
Soviet black-and-white films
Soviet war drama films
1940s war drama films
1944 drama films